Khaled Sabet (born 12 October 1961) is an Egyptian sports shooter. He competed in the mixed skeet event at the 1992 Summer Olympics.

References

1961 births
Living people
Egyptian male sport shooters
Olympic shooters of Egypt
Shooters at the 1992 Summer Olympics
Place of birth missing (living people)